Archibald Hastie (1791 – 9 November 1857) was a British Radical politician.

Buchan was elected Radical MP for Paisley at a by-election in 1836—caused by the resignation of Alexander Graham Speirs—and held the seat until his death in 1857.

References

External links
 

UK MPs 1835–1837
UK MPs 1837–1841
UK MPs 1841–1847
UK MPs 1847–1852
UK MPs 1852–1857
UK MPs 1857–1859
1791 births
1857 deaths
Whig (British political party) MPs for Scottish constituencies
Scottish Liberal Party MPs